PM3 or PM-3 may be:

Pm3 (dentistry), dental nomenclature for premolar tooth
PM3 (chemistry), Computational chemistry
PM3 (project management, software development, CMMI), Project Management Maturity Model
Paper Mario 3, a 2007 Wii game